Sangharshana is a 1983 Indian Telugu-language action film directed by K. Murali Mohana Rao. The film stars Chiranjeevi and Vijayashanti with Kaikala Satyanarayana, Rao Gopala Rao and Gummadi in other vital roles. It is the only Chiranjeevi film financed by D. Rama Naidu. Chakravarthy scored the film's soundtrack. The film was a Superhit at the box office.

Plot 
Dilip (Chiranjeevi) is educated in the United States and returns to India after a long time. His father Janardhan rao runs a factory and wants his son to take over his business. Meanwhile, Dilip meets Rekha  and they both fall in love with each other. One day, Dilip realizes that his father is a smuggler, who runs his dark business under the mask of his factory. He senses the danger and refuses to take over his father's position and joins the same factory as a labour. He rises to union leader's position and revolts against his father.

Cast 
 Chiranjeevi as Dilip
 Vijayashanti as Radha
 Prabhakar Reddy as Dilip's father 
 Gummadi as Krishnamurthy 
 Rao Gopala Rao as Site Manager 
 Nalini as Rekha
 Sivakrishna as Shivam
 Allu Ramalingaiah as Varahamurthy

Soundtrack

References

External links

  Sangharshana OTT

1983 films
1980s Telugu-language films
Films scored by K. Chakravarthy
Suresh Productions films